Hacımahmut can refer to:

 Hacımahmut, Aşkale
 Hacımahmut, Göynük